J. Philip Johnson (born March 28, 1938) is an American attorney and jurist who served as a Justice of the North Dakota Supreme Court from 1974 to 1975 again in 1992. When not serving as justice of the state court, Johnson operated a private legal practice in Fargo, North Dakota.

Early life and education 
He was born in Minot, North Dakota and attended Minot State University before earning a Bachelor of Arts in philosophy from the University of North Dakota in 1960. He earned a Juris Doctor degree from the University of North Dakota School of Law in 1962.

Career 
Following admission to the State Bar Association of North Dakota, he was admitted to the Judge Advocate General's Corps, United States Army. After three years of active duty, including service in Washington, D.C. handling court martial appeals, he returned to North Dakota. He then joined a law firm in Fargo for several years and also served as Assistant State's Attorney for Cass County, North Dakota. 

In June 1974, Johnson was appointed to the Supreme Court. He was defeated for re-election to a full term and left office on January 9, 1975, after serving for seven months. After the resignation of Justice H. F. Gierke III, Governor George A. Sinner appointed Johnson to the Court on February 11, 1992. He served until January 1, 1993, after an unsuccessful election bid to fill out the remaining term. Johnson then returned to private practice in the Fargo law firm of Wold Johnson, P.C.

External links

North Dakota Supreme Court official website

1938 births
Living people
People from Minot, North Dakota
Military personnel from North Dakota
Minot State University alumni
University of North Dakota alumni
Justices of the North Dakota Supreme Court
Lawyers from Fargo, North Dakota